Kamal Lohani (26 June 1934 – 20 June 2020) was a Bangladeshi journalist. He was awarded Ekushey Padak in 2015 by the Government of Bangladesh. He served as the director general of Shilpakala Academy from April 2009 until April 2011.

Career
Lohani got his first job as a journalist in the Daily Millat in 1955. He joined as a secretary at Chhayanaut, a cultural organization, in 1962. He formed a left cultural organization – Kranti in 1967.

Early life 
Kamal Lohani was born on 26 June 1934, in the village of Santala in the then Pabna District (now Ullahpara Upazila of Sirajganj District). His father's name was Abu Yusuf Mohammad Musa Khan Lohani and his mother's name was Rokeya Khan Lohani. His real name is Abu Naeem Mohammad Mostafa Kamal Khan Lohani. In 1952, he passed the secondary examination from Pabna Zilla School. He completed his higher education from Govt. Edward College, Pabna.

Personal life

In 1960, Lohani married Syeda Dipti Rani (d. 2007). She was his fellow political party member. Together they had two daughters and a son.

Death 
Lohani died from COVID-19-related complications on 20 June 2020, amid the COVID-19 pandemic in Bangladesh.

References

1934 births
2020 deaths
Bangladeshi journalists
Bangladeshi communists
Recipients of the Ekushey Padak
Honorary Fellows of Bangla Academy
Place of birth missing
Pabna Edward College alumni
Deaths from the COVID-19 pandemic in Bangladesh